was a Japanese haiku poet and essayist.

Early life and career
Born in Tokyo, Japan, she moved at the age of six with her family to Tochigi Prefecture to flee the wartime B-29 aerial bombing of Tokyo. She spent the rest of her childhood in the Tochigi countryside, returning to Tokyo when she entered Tokyo Woman's Christian University, majoring in psychology. After graduation, she was hired by Hakuhodo, an advertising firm where she worked until retirement at age 60, rising to a senior management position.

Haiku

Momoko Kuroda was exposed to haiku at an early age through her mother, who was a member of a local haiku group. Upon her mother's encouragement, she sought out Yamaguchi Seison (1892–1988) and asked to join his haiku group when she was in university. After graduating university, she stopped composing haiku for a period of nearly ten years, then returned to the art and to Seison's haiku group in 1968. That same year, she began what became her trademark haiku pilgrimages, the first of which was to Japan's famous cherry blossoms and spanned 28 years. In 2012, she completed a 30-year endeavor leading haiku pilgrimages to Japan's four main pilgrimage routes: The Shikoku, Saigoku, Bandõ, and Chichibu circuits. In 1990, after the death of her mentor Seison, she created a nationwide haiku organization, AOI (藍生), which she led, and Aoi, a haiku magazine.

Kuroda's first haiku collection, ki no isu (The Wooden Chair) published in 1981, received the Best Modern Woman Haiku Poet award and the Haiku Poets Association Best New Talent award. Her fifth haiku collection, Nikkõ Gekkõ (Sunlight, Moonlight) earned her the prestigious 2011 Dakotsu prize. She was a haiku selector for the Nihon Keizai Shimbun.

Kuroda did not speak or write in English. Abigail Friedman, a United States diplomat based in Tokyo who attended Kuroda's haiku groups, was inspired to write a book about her experience, The Haiku Apprentice: Memoirs of Writing Poetry in Japan (2006). Friedman published 100 of Kuroda's haikus in English translation in the book I Wait for the Moon: 100 Haiku of Momoko Kuroda (2014).

Death
Kuroda died from a brain haemorrhage on 13 March 2023, at the age of 84.

Selected works

Haiku collections
 Ki no Isu. Bokuyōsha, 1981
 Mizu no Tobira. Bokuyōsha, 1983
 Ichiboku Issō. Kashinsha, 1995
 Kaka Sōjō. Kadokawa Shoten, 2005
 Nikkō Gekkō. Kadokawa, 2010
 Ginga Sanga. Kadokawa, 2013

Other works
 Anata no haiku zukuri kigo no aru kurashi. Shogakukan, 1986
 Kyõ kara hajimeru haiku. Shogakukan, 1992
 Haiku, hajimete mimasenka. Rippū Shobō, 1997
 Kuroda momoko saijiki. Rippū Shobō, 1997
 Haiku to deau. Shogakukan, 1997
 Hajimete no haiku zukuri 5-7-5 no tanoshimi. Shogakukan, 1997
 Hiroshige Edo meisho ginkō. Shogakukan, 1997
 "Oku no hosomichi" o Yuku. Shogakukan, 1997 (with photography by Ueda Shōji)
 Katengecchi. Rippū Shobō, 2001
 Shōgen: Shōwa no haiku. Two volumes. Kadokawa, 2002
 Kigo no kioku. Hakusuisha, 2003
 Nuno no saijiki. Hakusuisha, 2003
 Shikoku henro ginkō. Chūō Kōron Shinsha, 2003
 Kaneko Tōta yōjōkun. Hakusuisha, 2005
 Haiku rettō nihon sumizumi gin’yū. Iizuka Shoten, 2005
 Haiku no tamatebako. Iizuka Shoten, 2008
 Kurashi no saijiki. Iwanami Shoten, 2011
 Tegami saijiki. Hakusuisha, 2013
 Kataru Tōta waga haiku jinsei. Iwanami Shoten, 2014

Awards
 1975 Natsukusa New Poet Award
 1982 Best Modern Woman Haiku Poet award for Ki no Isu
 1982 5th Haiku Poets Association Best New Talent award for Ki no Isu
 1986 Natsukusa Award
 1995 Haiku Poets Association award for Ichiboku Issō
 2008 1st Katsura Nobuko award
 2011 45th Dakotsu Prize for Nikkō Gekkō

References

Works cited

Further reading
 
 

1938 births
2023 deaths
21st-century Japanese poets
People from Tokyo
Japanese women poets
20th-century Japanese poets
20th-century Japanese women writers
Japanese haiku poets
Tokyo Woman's Christian University alumni